Harbour Grace-Port de Grave is a provincial electoral district in Newfoundland and Labrador, which is represented by one member in the Newfoundland and Labrador House of Assembly. It was contested for the first time in the 2015 provincial election.

The district was preceded by Port de Grave.

Members of the House of Assembly
The district has elected the following Members of the House of Assembly:

Election results

|-

|-

|-

References

Newfoundland and Labrador provincial electoral districts